Ana Kata Nau was a Tongan attorney. She was the first female attorney in Tonga.

Life
Ana Kata Nau was born on March 17, 1899, at Nelafu, Vavau, Tonga to Tevita Kata Nau II (a reverend minister) and Sela Mahe. She received her education from Tupou College in Nukualofa, Tonga, and initially embarked on careers as an educator (1921-1926; 1929) and nurse (1926-1929) before graduating as a lawyer. She died in 1996.

See also 
 List of first women lawyers and judges in Oceania

References 

1899 births
1996 deaths
Tongan lawyers
Tongan women
People from Vavau
20th-century women lawyers